Thuli Bheri River, a tributary of Bheri River which in turn is the tributary of the Karnali River. It starts in the Chharka region of Dolpa District where it is known as the Bhargung Khola (river).

See also
List of rivers of Nepal

References

Rivers of Karnali Province
Dolpa District